Lygeum is a genus of Mediterranean plants in the grass family. It is placed in its own tribe Lygeeae, which is sister to Nardeae.

The only known species is Lygeum spartum, commonly called esparto grass, cord grass or  albardine, which is distributed in arid areas around the Mediterranean Sea. It is similar to Stipa tenacissima and both species are used to produce a fiber product known as esparto or esparto grass.

Description
The rhizome and the base of the stem are scaly. They are wrapped in a lance-shaped bract called a spatheole.

Distribution
Lygeum spartinum is native to southern Europe and North Africa, where its distribution includes Crete, Italy, Spain, Algeria, Egypt, Libya, Morocco, and Tunisia. It may have been introduced to Kashmir.

Habitat
Rocky sea shores, or on dry sandy or clay and often calcareous soil.

Uses
Lygeum spartum fibres have high tensile strength and flexibility, and is used for making ropes, sandals, baskets, mats and other durable articles. They have also used in the manufacture of high quality paper. It can also be used locally as a fodder for livestock and to stabilise sand dunes and rehabilitate salt soils, due to its tolerance of saline conditions.

References

Pooideae
Monotypic Poaceae genera
Flora of North Africa
Fiber plants
Flora of the Mediterranean Basin